There has been one Ashman Baronetcy which was created for Sir Herbert Ashman on 23 November 1907 in the Baronetage of the United Kingdom.

The baronetcy became extinct on the death of the 2nd Baronet.

Ashman of Thirlmere, Somerset (1907)
Sir Herbert Ashman, 1st Baronet (1854–1914)
Sir Frederick Herbert Ashman, 2nd Baronet (1875–1916) Baronetcy extinct on his death

References

Extinct baronetcies in the Baronetage of the United Kingdom